Venera 8 ( meaning Venus 8) was a probe in the Soviet Venera program for the exploration of Venus and was the second robotic space probe to conduct a successful landing on the surface of Venus.

Venera 8 was a Venus atmospheric probe and lander. Its instrumentation included temperature, pressure, and light sensors as well as an altimeter, gamma ray spectrometer, gas analyzer, and radio transmitters.

Journey to Venus
The spacecraft took 118 days to reach Venus with one mid-course correction on 6 April 1972, separating from the bus (which contained a cosmic ray detector, solar wind detector, and ultraviolet spectrometer) and entering the atmosphere on 22 July 1972 at 08:37 UT. A refrigeration system attached to the bus was used to pre-chill the descent capsule's interior prior to atmospheric entry in order to prolong its life on the surface. Descent speed was reduced from 41,696 km/h to about 900 km/h by aerobraking. The 2.5 meter diameter parachute opened at an altitude of 60 km.

Descent
Venera 8 transmitted data during the descent. A sharp decrease in illumination was noted at 35 to 30 km altitude and wind speeds of less than 1 m/s were measured below 10 km. The lander mass was 495 kg.

Lander
The lander continued to send back data for 50 minutes, 11 seconds after landing before failing due to the harsh surface conditions. The probe confirmed the earlier data on the high Venus surface temperature and pressure (470 degrees Celsius, 90 atmospheres) returned by Venera 7, and also measured the light level as being suitable for surface photography, finding it to be similar to the amount of light on Earth on an overcast day with roughly 1 km visibility.

Venera 8's photometer measurements showed for the first time that the Venusian clouds end at a high altitude, and the atmosphere was relatively clear from there down to the surface.  The on-board gamma ray spectrometer measured the uranium/thorium/potassium ratio of the surface rock, indicating it was similar to Alkali basalt.

Payload experiments

 Temperature and pressure sensors - ITD
 Accelerometer - DOU-1M
 Cadmium sulfide Photometers - IOV-72
 Ammonia analyser – IAV-72
 Gamma ray spectrometer  – GS-4
 Radar altimeter Auxiliary thruster
 Radio Doppler experiment

See also

 List of missions to Venus
 Timeline of artificial satellites and space probes

References

External links 

Plumbing the Atmosphere of Venus
Venera 8 NASA NSSDC Master Catalog Data

Venera program
Derelict landers (spacecraft)
1972 in the Soviet Union
Spacecraft launched in 1972
3MV